Jamesioideae is a subfamily of the hydrangea family (Hydrangeaceae). It contains two genera, Fendlera and Jamesia.
The subfamily was described by Larry Hufford in 2001.

References

Hydrangeaceae
Asterid subfamilies